Laserdance is a Dutch italo disco studio project that had consisting of musicians Erik van Vliet and Michiel van der Kuy. The studio project has been categorized as part of subgenre known as spacesynth and has been generally considered as a major influence for the subgenre and has remained popular around Europe in the mid-1980s. All of Laserdance's tracks are known to feature basic analog synthesizers, drum machines and vocoders. The name of the studio project comes from the first single with the same name published in 1984. Numerous hit singles from Laserdance include Goody's Return, Humanoid Invasion, Power Run, Fear and Shotgun (Into The Night).

Composer Michiel van der Kuy and producer Erik van Vliet are known to be key members of the studio project, while other members such as Ruud van Es, Rob van Eijk and Julius Wijnmalen, the composer of the recent studio album Strikes Back from 2000, have been involved as well. The very first single of Laserdance has been published in 1984 and the first album Future Generation was released in 1987 with successful sales for the studio project and generated a lot of interest towards the spacesynth genre.

History
Producer Erik van Vliet started studio project under the title "Laser Dance" in 1984 by releasing the first single with the same name on Break Records label and later on Hotsound Productions. Erik van Vliet and Fonny de Wulf (the producer of Rofo) produced the single, that is based upon the song with the same name by Sponooch from 1979. Michiel van der Kuy himself joined the studio project and became the composer of the project by composing the second single Goody's Return in 1984.

The first Laserdance album titled Future Generation was released by Hotsound Records in 1987 and was considered big success with approximately 150 000 copies being sold. Between 1987 and 1995, Laserdance was producing new studio album every year with numerous singles and few compilation albums being released in-between. Notably, the fifth studio album Ambiente from 1991 contains only an ambient tracks, while the seventh album Hypermagic from 1993 is the only Laserdance album to being released separately on Dolby Surround.

The declining era of italo disco in early 1990s was affecting on Laserdance in terms of sales as the ninth studio album The Guardian of Forever in 1996 mixes the spacesynth with more house and trance tracks, one of the latter ones being a cover of Humate's Love Stimulation, accompanied by a clarifying statement that it was not composed by van der Kuy on the CD casing. This tonal shift received cold feedback from fans and the studio project was stopped for few years. However, Erik van Vliet was planning to bring Laserdance back, while Michiel van der Kuy was working as producer of Alice Deejay and his own music project Rygar. Erik hired Julius Wijnmalen to be composer of the recent studio album called Strikes Back that was released on ZYX Music label in 2000.

After the release of Strikes Back, anything about Laserdance's state hadn't been known or confirmed, although Michiel van der Kuy stated in December 2010 interview to have no plans for continuing on Laserdance while working with his new music project called Rygar. At the same time, Erik van Vliet mentioned on Discogs that he was still looking for a "new Michiel van der Kuy" to continue Laserdance with after Wijnmalen had demanded too much money from him for another album. Eventually in April 2016, Erik van Vliet and Michiel van der Kuy confirmed in social media that a new record is soon to be released. The first track from the album was premiered on Radio Stad den Haag in Netherlands on April 17, 2016. The recent album titled Force of Order has been released on September 30, 2016. In October 2017, Erik van Vliet posted an image to his Facebook account, on which he proclaimed a new Laserdance album  was being worked on, with the preliminary release date being given as April 2018.

Discography

Studio albums
 Future Generation
 Around the Planet
 Discovery Trip
 Changing Times
 Ambiente
 Technological Mind
 Hypermagic
 Fire on Earth
 The Guardian of Forever
 Strikes Back
 Force of Order
 Trans Space Express

Compilation albums
 The Maxi-CD Collection Of Laserdance
 The Best Of Laserdance
 Laserdance Orchestra vol. 1
 Laserdance Orchestra vol. 2
 The 12" Mixes
 Greatest Hits & Remixes

Singles
"Laser Dance" (1984)
"Goody's Return" (12") (1984)
"Humanoid Invasion" (1986)
"Power Run" (1987)
"Fear (Remix) / Battle Cry (Remix)" (1987)
"You & Me" (1988)
"Shotgun (Into The Night)" (1988)
"Laserdance ('88 Remix)" (1988)
"Cosmo Tron" (1989)
"The Challenge" (1990)
"Technoid" (1992)

Megamixes
"Megamix Vol. 1" (1988)
"Megamix Vol. 2" (1989)
"Megamix Vol. 3" (1990)
"Megamix Vol. 4" (1991)

See also
Koto

References

External links
 
 
 

Dutch disco groups
Dutch dance music groups
Dutch electronic music groups
Electronic music duos
Italo disco groups
Musical groups established in 1984
Science fiction music
Techno music groups